Kenneth, Ken, or Kenny Carter may refer to:

 Ken Carter (born 1959), former American high school basketball coach in Richmond, California
 "Ken Carter" (song), a 1995 song by Ammonia
 Ken Carter (stuntman) (1938–1983), Canadian stunt driver
 Kenneth Carter (accountant) (1906–1968), Canadian chartered accountant
 Kenneth Carter (politician) (1933–2017), American politician in Rhode Island
 Kenny Carter (1961–1986), English speedway driver who shot his wife and himself
 Kenny Carter (American football) (born 1967), American football coach

Carter, Kenneth